The men's coxless four competition at the 2012 Summer Olympics in London took place at Dorney Lake which, for the purposes of the Games venue, is officially termed Eton Dorney.

Schedule

All times are British Summer Time (UTC+1)

Results

Heats
First three of each heat qualify to the semifinals, remainder goes to the repeachge.

Heat 1

Heat 2

Heat 3

Repechage
First three qualify to the semifinals.

Semifinals
First three qualify to the final, remainder to Final B.

Semifinal 1

Semifinal 2

Finals

Final B

Final A

References

Men's coxless four
Men's events at the 2012 Summer Olympics